The Roman Catholic Diocese of Jinotega (erected 18 June 1982, as the Territorial Prelature of Jinotega) is a suffragan of the Archdiocese of Managua. It was elevated on 30 April 1991.

Ordinaries
Pedro Lisímaco de Jesús Vílchez Vílchez (1982–2005) 
Carlos Enrique Herrera Gutiérrez, O.F.M. (2005– )

See also
Catholic Church in Nicaragua

References

External links
 

Jinotega
Jinotega
Jinotega
1982 establishments in Nicaragua
Jinotega